Booker T. Washington School may refer to:

Booker T. Washington School (Rushville, Indiana), listed on the National Register of Historic Places in Rush County, Indiana
Booker T. Washington School (Terre Haute, Indiana), listed on the National Register of Historic Places in Vigo County, Indiana
Booker T. Washington School (Ashland, Kentucky), a historic African-American school
Booker T. Washington School (Montgomery, Alabama), Montgomery's first high school for African Americans
Booker T. Washington School, an elementary school in the Las Cruces Public Schools district
Booker T. Washington Junior / Senior High School in Tampa, Florida, now the B. T. Washington Elementary School, part of Hillsborough County Schools

See also
Booker T. Washington High School (disambiguation)